Ustica is a small Italian island in the Tyrrhenian Sea. Roughly 1,300 people live in the comune (municipality) of the same name. There is a regular ferry service from the island to Palermo in Sicily.

History

Excavations begun in 1989 at Tramontana, also known as Faraglioni, have unearthed what was a large prehistoric village dating from the 14th to the 13th century BC. The foundations of some 300 stone-built houses were discovered, and the defensive walls of the settlement are among the strongest fortifications of any period known in Italy. It is believed that these early settlers came over from the Aeolian Islands.

In historic times, the island has been populated at least since about 1500 BC by Phoenician peoples. In ancient Greece, the Island was named Osteodes (ossuary) in memory of the thousands of Carthaginian mutineers left there to die of hunger in the 4th century BC. The Romans renamed the island Ustica, Latin for burnt, for its black rocks. The island is also known locally as the "black pearl".

In the 6th century, a Benedictine community settled in the island, but was soon forced to move because of ongoing wars between Europeans and Arabs. Attempts to colonize the island in the Middle Ages failed because of raids by Barbary pirates.

In the mid-18th century, the island was settled by approximately 90 people from the island of Lipari, an island also located north of Sicily, but east of Ustica.  They brought with them the patron saint of Lipari, Bartholomew the Apostle, who became the patron saint of Ustica as well.  In the mid- to late 19th century and early 20th century, as the population of the island grew too large, hundreds of Ustican families emigrated to the United States. Many of these families settled in New Orleans and surrounding areas, where there are today thousands of descendants whose ties remain strong to Ustica. A smaller number of families settled in San Jose and San Francisco, in New York, Massachusetts, Oregon, Montana and in Chicago.

Fascist prison island
During the Fascist years in Italy and until the 1950s, Ustica was used as an island prison. Benito Mussolini banished thousands of political opponents to Ustica, often as many as 1,500 at a time; many were homosexuals. Both Antonio Gramsci and Amadeo Bordiga were sent there.  In the early 1940s Yugoslav war prisoners were crammed onto the island, and many of them died from malnutrition and tuberculosis. In the 1950s they were followed by suspected Mafiosi expelled from Sicily.

On June 27, 1980, Itavia Flight 870 crashed into the sea off the island while en route to Palermo, killing all 81 people on board. The event became known as the Ustica massacre.

Environment

The island has limited sources of water, and vegetation is consequently scarce. The coast has numerous rocks and grottoes.

Ustica is home of the honeybee Apis mellifera sicula.

Tourism

Ustica is particularly known for scuba diving, with a number of diving schools established on the island. Recreational divers are attracted by the relatively deep dives, which are a feature of the island's volcanic geology.

See also
 List of islands of Italy

References

External links

 Ustica Genealogy

Islands of Sicily
Stratovolcanoes of Italy
Volcanoes of the Tyrrhenian
Pleistocene stratovolcanoes
Pleistocene Europe
Province of Palermo